These are the top 25 albums of 2007  in Australia from the Australian Recording Industry Association (ARIA) End of Year Albums Chart.

Top 25

References 

Australian record charts
2007 in Australian music
Australia Top 25 Albums